Tutagachevo (Tutağas) is a rural locality (a village) in Nizhnesikiyazovsky Selsoviet, Baltachevsky District, Bashkortostan, Russia. The population was 308 as of 2010. There are 7 streets.

Geography 
Tutagachevo is located 12 km north of Starobaltachevo (the district's administrative centre) by road. Mishcherovo is the nearest rural locality.

References 

Rural localities in Baltachevsky District